Pinealectomy is a surgical procedure in which the pineal gland is removed. It is performed only in rare cases, where a pineocytoma or a pineal gland cyst has become life-threatening.

See also
 Hypophysectomy
 Thyroidectomy
 Adrenalectomy
 List of surgeries by type

References

Endocrine surgery
Surgical removal procedures